The 2011 Dial Before You Dig Australian Manufacturers' Championship 500 was an endurance motor race for production cars. It was held on 10 and 11 September 2011, at Sandown Raceway in Melbourne, Victoria, Australia. It was Round 4 of the 2011 Australian Manufacturers' Championship, Round 4 of the 2011 Australian Production Car Championship and Round 2 of the 2011 Australian Production Car Endurance Championship. The race was won by Stuart Kostera and Ian Tulloch, driving a Mitsubishi Lancer Evolution X. The Lancer Evolution 9 of Tony Quinn and Klark Quinn finished in second  place with another Lancer Evolution 9 in third, driven by Jim Pollicina and Dean Kelland.

The race was run over two days and had two legs, each one scheduled to be eighty laps and 250km in length. However, due to stoppages and delays on each day while other categories were running, the Saturday leg was shortened to 73 laps and the Sunday leg to 60 laps. The first leg was won by John Bowe and Peter O'Donnell in a BMW 335i while Kostera and Tulloch won the second leg and the race overall.

Class Structure
 Class A – Extreme Performance
 Class B – High Performance
 Class C – Performance Touring
 Class D – Production Touring
 Class E – Compact Touring
 Class I – Invitational

Results
Results were as follows:

References

External links
 Australian Manufacturers' Championship at www.manufacturerschampionship.com.au

Dial Before You Dig Australian Manufacturers' Championship 500
Motorsport at Sandown
Australian Manufacturers' Championship
Australian Production Car Championship